Donté Colley is a Canadian Creator.

Early in his life
Donté Colley was born in Toronto, Ontario, on May 16, 1997. He grew up in Toronto, and showed an early interest and talent in dance. He attended Wexford Collegiate School for the Arts in Scarborough as a teen. He credits his time there as his opportunity to come into his own artistically in a positive and supportive place.

Career
Colley is a digital communications student who seeks to combine his love of dance with his uplifting messaging to create a safe space on social media through a message of self-love. He has appeared on Good Morning America, Busy Tonight, ETALK Canada, and has been featured on USA Today, Time, Glossier, NPR, Georgetakei.com, Globe & Mail, Flare.com, Allure and Fashion Magazine.

In April 2019, Colley appeared in Ariana Grande's Monopoly music video. The music video shared similar themes with Colley's popular emoji-assisted videos.

In 2021, Colley narrated the livestreamed presentation of children's and animated programming awards for the 9th Canadian Screen Awards.

References 

1997 births
Living people
Canadian male dancers
People from Toronto
21st-century Canadian dancers
Black Canadian LGBT people
Canadian LGBT entertainers
LGBT dancers
Black Canadian dancers
21st-century Canadian LGBT people